Misael Silva Jansen (born 4 July 1987 in São Luís, Brazil), or simply Misael, is a forward who is currently playing for Portuguesa.

Career
Misael started on Moto Club, then was loaned to Sampaio Corrêa to get to Ceará in 2009 but was signed in 2010 as a starter and main player in the club. He moved on loan to Vasco da Gama and Sport Recife in the 2011 season.

Career statistics

Contract
 Ceará.

References

External links

1987 births
Living people
Brazilian footballers
Ceará Sporting Club players
CR Vasco da Gama players
Sport Club do Recife players
Luverdense Esporte Clube players
Ituano FC players
Paysandu Sport Club players
Red Bull Brasil players
Esporte Clube Bahia players
Grêmio Esportivo Brasil players
Associação Ferroviária de Esportes players
Joinville Esporte Clube players
Sampaio Corrêa Futebol Clube players
Esporte Clube XV de Novembro (Piracicaba) players
Santa Cruz Futebol Clube players
Clube Atlético Votuporanguense players
Barra Futebol Clube players
Associação Portuguesa de Desportos players
Audax Rio de Janeiro Esporte Clube players
Campeonato Brasileiro Série A players
Campeonato Brasileiro Série B players
Campeonato Brasileiro Série C players
Association football forwards